Protosiphonaceae is a family of chlorophyte green algae, in the order Chlamydomonadales.

Genera
, AlgaeBase accepted the following genera:
Protosiphon Klebs – 2 species
Spongiosarcinopsis A.Temraleeva, S.Moskalenko, E.Mincheva, Y.Bukin & M.Sinetova – 1 species
Urnella Playfair – 1 species

References

Chlorophyceae families
Chlamydomonadales